Rotes Wasser may refer to:

Rotes Wasser (Ohm), a river of Hesse, Germany, tributary of the Ohm
Rotes Wasser (Müglitz), a river of Saxony, Germany, tributary of the Müglitz